Sheikh Muhammad (1771–1838) was a Lezgin sheikh, founder of Muridism in the Caucasus and teacher of all imams of Dagestan and Chechnya. Legendary Imam Shamil was his the most famous student.

Biography 
Sheikh Muhammad was born in 1771 in the Lezgin village of Vini-Yarag located in the south of Dagestan. He received his initial Islamic education in the madrasah of his native village. He studied with famous Ulama in the villages of Sogratl and Arakan. His teachers were such famous Dagestani theologians as Said Khachmazwi, Said Shinazwi, Hasan Kudaliwi and Maharram Akhzakhwi.

References 

1771 births
1838 deaths
People from Dagestan
Lezgins
North Caucasian independence activists
People of the Caucasian War
Resistance to the Russian Empire